Peter Cole (born 1957) is an American poet and translator.

 Peter Cole  may also refer to:

Peter Harold Cole, electronic engineer
Pete Cole, American football player
Peter Cole (film editor), winner of 17th Daytime Emmy Awards
Pete Cole of This Film Is Not Yet Rated
Pete Cole, manager/promoter of Inter (band)

See also
Peter Coles, cosmologist